There is a small community of Indians in Cambodia mainly expatriates and immigrants from India.

History

Relations between India and Cambodia go back to ancient times. Indian traders made contact with south east Asia and vice versa as far back as before the common era. South east Asian civilizations such as the Khmers were speculated by scholars to have traveled as far as the Indus river delta. Modern scholars have proposed that early Khmer arts and buildings showed a south Indian as speculated by earlier scholars. The Khmer language was heavily influenced by Cholan, Tami the writing system was derived from like most of other native south east Asian nations'. 

The first Indians in modern times to settle in Cambodia arrived in the 1960s and 1970s. Primarily coming from the Southern province of Tamil Nadu, they worked as jewellers, moneylenders and traders around Central Market, but they left the country once the Khmer Rouge arrived. The Indians returned to Cambodia when Pol Pot’s regime collapsed.

Current status
Today, many Indians in Cambodia are involved in pharmaceuticals, the United Nations and businesses such as restaurants. The growing economy is also attracting more opportunity seekers from India. Unlike other Indian communities in Southeast Asia such as Bangkok, Kuala Lumpur or Singapore, the Indian population in Phnom Penh is too small to support a Little India quarter, but it remains an intimate and close-knit group that has integrated well into local society.

Indian culture is visible in Cambodia. Indian Hindu festivals like Diwali and Holi are celebrated by the Indian community. Thanks to satellite television, popular Hindi soap operas are shown daily while a small selection of Indian restaurants hosts weekly showings of the latest Bollywood Hindi films as well as cricket matches. Hindi film DVDs can be bought throughout the capital, and expatriates can peruse a number of Indian-based websites for the latest news and entertainment.

Notable people
 Isoup Ganthy (1929 – 1976), equestrian, 1956 Olympian

See also 
 Kaundinya I
 Cambodia-India relations

References

External links
Indian Association of Cambodia

Indian
Cambodian
Cambodia